Cergău is a commune located in Alba County, Transylvania, Romania. It has a population of 1,747 and is composed of three villages: Cergău Mare (the commune centre; Magyarcserged), Cergău Mic (Bolgárcserged) and Lupu (Farkastelke).

Cergău Mic
The village of Cergău Mic was first mentioned in 1303 as Bolgarchergewd and in 1306 as Chergeod Bulgaricum. The first reference is the earliest evidence to the presence of the village's Bulgarian population. The prevalent theory is that Bulgarians arrived as refugees from the Vidin region (in modern northwest Bulgaria) and possibly from the Svishtov region (north central Bulgaria). These groups were originally of the Bogomil and Paulician sects respectively and were subject to religious persecution by the Eastern Orthodox authorities of the Second Bulgarian Empire. With their settlement in Transylvania, the Bulgarians of Cergău Mic adopted Roman Catholicism and subsequently Protestantism (Lutheranism) because they regarded these confessions as closest to their original beliefs among the denominations tolerated in Transylvania.

As late as 1995, researcher Todor Balkanski reports that many of the locals were eager to identify as Bulgarians, even though they had undergone a complete language shift from Bulgarian to Romanian. The name "Șchei", an old Romanian ethnonym for Bulgarian people, was also in widespread use as a self-identifier, its meaning equated to "Bulgarian" by the locals. In 1995, a 75-year-old local, Linca Secel, was able to recite two prayers in a Bulgarian dialect by heart, with no understanding of the meaning. With some differences, one of the prayers was also recorded by Lyubomir Miletich in 1896 and by Ion Muşlea in 1927. The gradual linguistic Romanianization of the Bulgarians in Cergău Mic is attested in 1808 with the first reference to the modern Romanian name of the village, Cergău Mic.

In the 1930 census, the village had a population of 830, of whom 762 identified as Romanians, 58 as Gypsies, 8 as Germans, 2 as Hungarians and none as Bulgarians. Confessionally, 443 people were Lutheran, 351 Greek Catholic, 25 Baptist, 10 Orthodox and 1 Reformed.

The historically Bulgarian population of Cergău Mic may be related to that of other historically Bulgarian villages in Transylvania proper, such as the commune centre Cergău Mare, Rusciori and Bungard in Sibiu County and the Șchei neighbourhood of Brașov.

Toponymy
 historical Romanian name: Cergău Șcheiesc, "Cergău of the Șchei [Bulgarians]";
 , "Bulgarian Cserged", from 1625 to 1911 Kis Cserged or Kiscserged, "Little Cserged";
 conjectured historical Bulgarian name: Чергов, Chergov

References

External links

Communes in Alba County
Localities in Transylvania
Bulgarian communities in Romania
Bogomilism